Yasser Usman (born 1980s) is an Indian television journalist, news presenter, and biographer. Born in Moradabad, Yasser began his career by working as a television presenter and was awarded the prestigious Ramnath Goenka Excellence in Journalism Award for his contribution. Usman has been recognised by the media as one of India's most successful film biographers.

As a biographer, Usman's meticulously researched books primarily focus on the great cinematic journeys of stars, delving not only into their stardom but also their turbulent personal lives and tragic downfalls. His recent book is Guru Dutt An Unfinished Story. Before this book, Usman's wrote the Untold trilogy, a series of books that contain the word "untold" in their titles, started with Rajesh Khanna: The Untold Story of India's First Superstar (2014), which marked his debut as a biographer, and concluded with Sanjay Dutt: The Crazy Untold Story of Bollywood's Bad Boy (2018). Along with Rekha: The Untold Story (2016), Rajesh Khanna was nominated for the Crossword Book Award.

Early life 
Yasser Usman was born in the 1980s in Moradabad.:xii His father, M. Usman, is a chemistry professor and college principal; his mother, Haseeba Khanam, is a philanthropist. After finishing his schooling in several cities of Uttar Pradesh, he moved to Delhi to attend the University of Delhi and the Ramjas College, graduating with Master of Science degree in environmental studies at the latter. He subsequently joined the Indian Institute of Mass Communication, training as a journalist for radio and television.

Career

Journalism 
He started a career with the television company B.A.G. Films, and followed it by working for Channel 7; he produced a reality sport show titled Speedster, hosted the film review show Premier 7, and wrote-directed Raaz: Forensic Files Se, a television show on forensic science in India. After resigning from Channel 7, Usman worked on an investigative show, Benaqab, and served as the creative consultant of The Tony B Show, a talk show aired on Channel V in 2006. Usman joined Star News (later renamed ABP News) in 2007, in which he specialized in the non-fiction programming part; he directed several documentaries about sports and biographies of political figures and film personalities. In addition to working as film critic and commentator, he hosted ABP News' digital show Cinema Uncut with Yasser Usman. In 2012, Usman won the Ramnath Goenka Excellence in Journalism Award for his contribution in film and television journalism. In 2016, the website Filmymonkey, on which he served as the founding editor, was launched.

Author 
In 2014, Usman made his debut as an author with Rajesh Khanna: The Untold Story of India's First Superstar, a Penguin Books biography about the actor and politician Rajesh Khanna. The writing started when he was in Mumbai to record a show for ABP News, at the same time he got to know about Khanna's death in 2012. Vijay Lokapally from The Hindu labelled it as an exception tribute to Khanna, but Gautam Chintamani of India Today observed that Usman did not detail much of his films. Following the publication, Usman said he received handwritten letters and emails from Khanna's fans, saying that they were surprised about Khanna's loneliness, motivating him to research other popular film stars' lives.:ix

Usman's next book, Rekha: The Untold Story, is about the actress Rekha. The second biography of the actress after Mohan Deep's Eurekha! (1999), Usman's one-year research for his work included collecting archives of magazine issues about Rekha and interviewing her contemporaries, around 40 to 50 people.:x–xii The Asian Age Nayare Ali wrote it as "a book that anyone who is a fan or even fascinated by the star, would be tempted to read". Rohini Nair of Firstpost saw the book reveals nothing "untold" about the actress, and felt Usman relied entirely on the existing sources. Sowmya Rajendran from The News Minute wrote positively of the book's prose, calling it "fast-paced and lucidly written with plenty of spice, making it a perfect airplane read".

Usman's other two books: Sanjay Dutt: The Crazy Untold Story of Bollywood's Bad Boy and Guru Dutt: An Unfinished Story, also garnered a generally positive reception. Published in 2018, the former details the life of the actor Sanjay Dutt, and is the last of his Untold trilogy, reflecting the use of the word "untold" in the title of Usman's first three books. It was controversial after Dutt decrying that the book was published without his authorisation. Mint Sanjukta Sharma praised Usman's deep research and his neutral point of view, and Film Companion listed it as one of the "top seven books on cinema of the year".

Guru Dutt: An Unfinished Story, released in 2021 by Simon & Schuster, describes the life of the filmmaker Guru Dutt. It was after watching Dutt's films at the 2004 Osian's Cinefan Festival of Asian and Arab Cinema when Usman was motivated to write about him. While researching for the book, Usman was met with the lack of free-domain archives of Dutt's interviews. Writing for The Hindu, Mini Anthikad Chhibber appreciated the book's remembrances by Dutt's sister, the artist Lalita Lajmi. In his review for Business Standard, the reviewer Chintan Girish Modi wrote, "Guru Dutt: An Unfinished Story is a moving account of a creative genius who was influenced by Hollywood melodrama, German expressionism, Bhakti poetry, and the Bauls of Bengal." Sathya Saran of The New Indian Express, however, gave a scathing review. The Hindustan Times featured the book in their "The Most Interesting Reads of the Week" listing, and The Telegraph included it in their year-end "Page Turners of 2021". Asian Voice (London) praised the book saying, "a mirror that reflects the hard hitting realities of cinema ever since its inception. It is a narrative that shatters the myths, the rose tinted glasses with which we as viewers look up to the film industry."

Reception 
Yasser Usman has been recognised by the media as one of India's most successful film biographers, and gained a reputation for his writings that primarily focus on what is called the "dark side" of Bollywood. All of his books are unauthorised biographies; writing for The Telegraph in 2018, "However, 'unauthorised' doesn't mean 'irresponsible'. It only means I was going to have a harder time piecing together the narrative." This has once led him to controversy after his book on Sanjay Dutt was published, when Dutt criticised Usman for not asking for his permission to write the book. Usman's books on Rajesh Khanna and Rekha, were nominated for the Crossword Book Award in the biography category.

Bibliography

References

External links
 
 

1980s births
Indian biographers
Indian film critics
Indian male journalists
Indian television presenters
Living people
Male biographers
People from Moradabad